Kieber can be the surname of

Heinrich Kieber, tax whistleblower, whose information lead to the 2008 Liechtenstein tax affair
Niklas Kieber (born 1993), a Liechtenstein footballer
Rita Kieber-Beck (born 1958), was Foreign Affairs Minister of Liechtenstein
Walter Kieber (born 1931), Prime Minister of Liechtenstein from 1974 to 1978
Wolfgang Kieber (born 1984), a Liechtenstein footballer
Joseph J. Kieber, Distinguished Professor of biology, University of North Carolina, Chapel Hill, and Member of the U.S. National Academy of Sciences

German-language surnames